Mason Township is an inactive township in Marion County, in the U.S. state of Missouri.

Mason Township was established in 1827, taking its name from nearby Fort Mason.

References

Townships in Missouri
Townships in Marion County, Missouri